The Hittite Sun Disc Monument is a memorial dedicated to Hittites created by sculptor Nusret Suman, and placed in the Sıhhiye Square in 1978.

History
It is a replica of a Hatti monument unearthed in excavations at Alacahöyük. In 1973, the symbol of the city was made by Mayor Vedat Dalokay. Examples of the Hittite Sun Disc from the tombs of the Hatti kings can be seen in the Museum of Anatolian Civilizations. The Hittite Sun Disc Monument was presented to the people of Ankara by the Anatolian Insurance Co. in 1977. The symbol of Ankara University is the Sun Disc. This symbol is commonly regarded as belonging to the Hittite civilization and usually connotes Ankara and Anatolia.

Hittite Sun Disc: Between 1977–1995, about 18 years is used as the symbol of Ankara Municipality. However, on June 29, 1995, this logo was amended as required by the decision of the Metropolitan Municipal Assembly of Ankara.

References

Monuments and memorials in Ankara
Buildings and structures in Ankara
Buildings and structures completed in 1978
1978 establishments in Turkey
Colossal statues in Turkey
Hittites
Outdoor sculptures in Turkey